= Chevron environmental record =

Chevron Corporation plays a major role in the production of greenhouse gas emissions. Over its history, Chevron has produced 58,598 million tonnes of carbon dioxide. In their 2023 reporting, Chevron’s emissions intensity metrics show that its upstream oil production emits ~24 kg CO₂e per barrel of oil equivalent, its gas production is also ~24 kg CO₂e/boe, methane intensity is ~2 kg CO₂e/boe, and flaring intensity is about 3 kg CO₂e/boe. For this reason, Chevron faces the difficult challenge of reducing its environmental impact while continuing to operate efficiently. Chevron has also had several lawsuits filed against them for their role in exacerbating the impacts of climate change.

Chevron's operations are being affected by climate in situations like natural disasters and climate extreme weather events. Some of this can be hurricanes, floodings that directly affect the company’s operations by imposing threats to its infrastructure, including offshore platforms and refineries.
